Batesia  is a monotypic butterfly genus of the family Nymphalidae. It contains only Batesia hypochlora, the painted beauty.

Subspecies
Batesia hypochlora hypochlora (Peru)
Batesia hypochlora hypoxantha Salvin & Godman, 1868 (Peru, Ecuador)

Distribution
This species is found in the upper Amazon areas of Brazil, Ecuador and Peru.

Description
Batesia hypochlora can reach a wingspan of 85-95 mm. The upperside of the wings is blue, with a submarginal band of the same color surrounding the outher margin of the hindwings. On the forewings there is a large pink patch. The underside of the hindwings is yellow, varying in tone from pale cream to deep saffron depending on locality.

References

Biblidinae
Fauna of Brazil
Nymphalidae of South America
Taxa named by Rudolf Felder
Taxa named by Baron Cajetan von Felder
Butterflies described in 1862